Holliday is a city in Archer County, Texas, United States. It is part of the Wichita Falls, Texas Metropolitan Statistical Area. The population was 1,758 at the 2010 census. The town is named for nearby Holliday Creek, named in turn for John Holliday, a member of a Republic of Texas military expedition.

Geography

U.S. Routes 82 and 277 bypass the city on the northwest, leading northeast to Wichita Falls and southwest to Seymour.

Demographics

2020 census

As of the 2020 United States census, there were 1,524 people, 598 households, and 465 families residing in the city.

2000 census
As of the census of 2000, there were 1,650 people, 622 households, and 462 families residing in the city. The population density was 836.4 people per square mile (323.1/km2). There were 676 housing units at an average density of 346.5/sq mi (133.8/km2). The racial makeup of the city was 96.02% White, 1.10% Native American, 0.1% Asian, 1.35% from other races, and 1.29% from two or more races. Hispanic or Latino of any race were 3.49% of the population.

There were 622 households, out of which 41.8% had children under the age of 18 living with them, 57.9% were married couples living together, 12.9% had a female householder with no husband present, and 25.6% were non-families. 23.0% of all households were made up of individuals, and 12.2% had someone living alone who was 65 years of age or older. The average household size was 2.62 and the average family size was 3.08.

In the city, the population was spread out, with 30.8% under the age of 18, 8.0% from 18 to 24, 29.9% from 25 to 44, 19.5% from 45 to 64, and 11.9% who were 65 years of age or older. The median age was 34 years. For every 100 females, there were 92.9 males. For every 100 females age 18 and over, there were 86.5 males.

The median income for a household in the city was $32,857, and the median income for a family was $40,625. Males had a median income of $29,375 versus $19,375 for females. The per capita income for the city was $16,384. About 9.6% of families and 13.0% of the population were below the poverty line, including 21.2% of those under age 18 and 9.0% of those age 65 or over.

Education
Holliday is served by the Holliday Independent School District.

Climate
The climate in this area is characterized by hot, humid summers and generally mild to cool winters.  According to the Köppen climate classification system, Holliday has a humid subtropical climate, Cfa on climate maps.

References

External links
 City of Holliday official website
 Handbook of Texas article

Cities in Archer County, Texas
Cities in Texas
Wichita Falls metropolitan area